Hindu Prajatantrik Party is the Hindu nationalist political party in Nepal. The goal of this party is to establish Nepal as a Hindu republic.

The party registered with the Election Commission of Nepal ahead of the 2008 Constituent Assembly election. and filed a list of candidates for the proportional representation vote. The party also fielded one candidate for the First Past the Post system, Govind Bahadur B.K. in the Chitwan-1 constituency.

References

Nepalese Hindu political parties
Hindu nationalism in Nepal
Hindu nationalism
Hindutva
Hinduism in Nepal
Far-right political parties
Right-wing parties
Right-wing populism in India
Monarchist parties

Nationalist parties